The Canadian Alliance Against Software Theft (CAAST) is a Canadian trade group affiliated with the Software Alliance (formerly known as the Business Software Alliance). Its mission statement is to "reduce software piracy in Canada through education, public policy and enforcement." The CAAST was established in 1990.

See also 
 Robert Holleyman

References 
 

Trade associations based in Canada
Technology trade associations
1990 establishments in Canada